Anecdotes of pious men is a book by Morteza Motahhari. It is an ethical fiction published in English by Ansariyan in 1993.

Narrative
It is based on historical short story of Islamic references.
The book has two volumes and it contains collections of 125 ethical fiction. Each volume of  the book has 75 ethical fiction. The original book was Persian and Saba Zehra Naqavi has translated it to English. Khadim Husayn Naqavi has edited it too.

Awards
Anecdotes of pious men won UNESCO Award, in 1965.

Publication
The book was launched in Iran in 1960.
The book was translated to Spanish
and Japanese.

TV program adaptation
A TV adaptation by Akbar Hor and Huoshang Pakravan was broadcast on IRIB 1 in 1981-1982.

See also
Understanding Islamic Sciences
Spiritual Discourses
Battle of Khorramshahr
Chess with the Doomsday Machine
Eternal Fragrance
Noureddin, Son of Iran
That Which That Orphan Saw
Fortune Told in Blood
Journey to Heading 270 Degrees

References

Books adapted into films
Iranian books
1993 books
1960 books
Books by Morteza Motahhari